This is a list of cases reported in volume 60 (19 How.) of United States Reports, decided by the Supreme Court of the United States in 1856 and 1857.

Nominative reports 
In 1874, the U.S. government created the United States Reports, and retroactively numbered older privately-published case reports as part of the new series.  As a result, cases appearing in volumes 1–90 of U.S. Reports have dual citation forms; one for the volume number of U.S. Reports, and one for the volume number of the reports named for the relevant reporter of decisions (these are called "nominative reports").

Benjamin Chew Howard 
Starting with the 42nd volume of U.S. Reports, the Reporter of Decisions of the Supreme Court of the United States was Benjamin Chew Howard. Howard was Reporter of Decisions from 1843 to 1860, covering volumes 42 through 65 of United States Reports which correspond to volumes 1 through 24 of his Howard's Reports. As such, the dual form of citation to, for example, Lathrop v. Judson is 60 U.S. (19 How.) 66 (1857).

Justices of the Supreme Court at the time of 60 U.S. (19 How.) 

The Supreme Court is established by Article III, Section 1 of the Constitution of the United States, which says: "The judicial Power of the United States, shall be vested in one supreme Court . . .". The size of the Court is not specified; the Constitution leaves it to Congress to set the number of justices. Under the Judiciary Act of 1789 Congress originally fixed the number of justices at six (one chief justice and five associate justices). Since 1789 Congress has varied the size of the Court from six to seven, nine, ten, and back to nine justices (always including one chief justice).

When the cases in 60 U.S. (19 How.) were decided the Court comprised these nine members:

Notable Case in 60 U.S. (19 How.)

Scott v. Sanford
Scott v. Sandford,              60 U.S. (19 How.) 393 (1857), is the most notorious and condemned decision in the history of the U.S. Supreme Court.  In it, the Court held that the US Constitution was not meant to include American citizenship for black people, regardless of whether they were enslaved or free, and so the rights and privileges that the Constitution confers upon American citizens could not apply to them.  Although Chief Justice Roger Taney and several of the other justices hoped that the decision would permanently settle the slavery controversy, which was increasingly dividing the American public, the decision's effect was the opposite. Taney's majority opinion suited the slaveholding states, but was intensely decried in the other states. The decision inflamed the national debate over slavery and deepened the divide that led ultimately to the Civil War. In 1865, after the Union won the Civil War, the Dred Scott ruling was voided by the Thirteenth Amendment to the US Constitution, which abolished slavery except as punishment for a crime, and the Fourteenth Amendment, which guaranteed citizenship for "all persons born or naturalized in the United States, and subject to the jurisdiction thereof".  The Supreme Court's decision has been continuously denounced ever since, both for its overt racism and its role in the near destruction of the United States four years later. Bernard Schwartz said that it "stands first in any list of the worst Supreme Court decisions—Chief Justice Hughes called it the Court's greatest self-inflicted wound." Junius P. Rodriguez wrote that it is "universally condemned as the U.S. Supreme Court's worst decision". Historian David Thomas Konig agrees that it was "unquestionably, our court's worst decision ever."

Citation style 

Under the Judiciary Act of 1789 the federal court structure at the time comprised District Courts, which had general trial jurisdiction; Circuit Courts, which had mixed trial and appellate (from the US District Courts) jurisdiction; and the United States Supreme Court, which had appellate jurisdiction over the federal District and Circuit courts—and for certain issues over state courts. The Supreme Court also had limited original jurisdiction (i.e., in which cases could be filed directly with the Supreme Court without first having been heard by a lower federal or state court). There were one or more federal District Courts and/or Circuit Courts in each state, territory, or other geographical region.

Bluebook citation style is used for case names, citations, and jurisdictions.  
 e.g.,"C.C.D.N.J." = United States Circuit Court for the District of New Jersey
 e.g.,"D. Mass." = United States District Court for the District of Massachusetts 
 "E." = Eastern; "M." = Middle; "N." = Northern; "S." = Southern; "W." = Western
 e.g.,"C.C.S.D.N.Y." = United States Circuit Court for the Southern District of New York
 e.g.,"M.D. Ala." = United States District Court for the Middle District of Alabama
 "Ct. Cl." = United States Court of Claims
 The abbreviation of a state's name alone indicates the highest appellate court in that state's judiciary at the time. 
 e.g.,"Pa." = Supreme Court of Pennsylvania
 e.g.,"Me." = Supreme Judicial Court of Maine

List of cases in 60 U.S. (19 How.)

Notes and references

See also
certificate of division

External links
  Case reports in volume 60 (19 How.) from Library of Congress
  Case reports in volume 60 (19 How.) from Court Listener
  Case reports in volume 60 (19 How.) from the Caselaw Access Project of Harvard Law School
  Case reports in volume 60 (19 How.) from Google Scholar
  Case reports in volume 60 (19 How.) from Justia
  Case reports in volume 60 (19 How.) from Open Jurist
 Website of the United States Supreme Court
 United States Courts website about the Supreme Court
 National Archives, Records of the Supreme Court of the United States
 American Bar Association, How Does the Supreme Court Work?
 The Supreme Court Historical Society

1856 in United States case law
1857 in United States case law